20th National Board of Review Awards
December 21, 1948
The 20th National Board of Review Awards were announced on December 21, 1948.

Top ten films 
Paisan
Day of Wrath
The Search
The Treasure of the Sierra Madre
Louisiana Story
Hamlet
The Snake Pit
Johnny Belinda
Joan of Arc
The Red Shoes

Winners 
 Best Film: Paisan
 Best Actor: Walter Huston (The Treasure of the Sierra Madre)
 Best Actress: Olivia de Havilland (The Snake Pit)
 Best Director: Roberto Rossellini (Paisan)
 Best Screenplay: John Huston (The Treasure of the Sierra Madre)

External links 
 National Board of Review of Motion Pictures :: Awards for 1948

1948
1948 film awards
1948 in American cinema